Protext may refer to:
Protext (Arnor), a word processor by Arnor
ProTEXT, a legal transcript condensing program